Tempest Anderson (7 December 1846–26 August 1913)<ref>Who's Who 1914, p. xxi</ref>) was an ophthalmic surgeon at York County Hospital in the United Kingdom, and an expert amateur photographer and vulcanologist. He was a member of the Royal Society Commission which was appointed to investigate the aftermath of the eruptions of Soufriere volcano, St Vincent and Mont Pelee, Martinique, West Indies which both erupted in May 1902. Some of his photographs of these eruptions were subsequently published in his book, Volcanic Studies in Many Lands.

 Early life and education 
He was born in York, was schooled at St Peter's School, York, and studied medicine at the University of London.
His father was William Charles Anderson, surgeon and Sheriff of York. His sister Constance married Percy Sladen, and his brother was Yarborough Anderson, a barrister. In 1904 Anderson received an honorary degree of DSc from the University of Leeds for his work on volcanoes.

Anderson lived at the family home of 17 Stonegate in the centre of York, and at 23 Stonegate, which is now the home to the York Medical Society. He built a pair of houses on the road now known as Moorgate, on land purchased from the Holgate Garden Society.
In 1911 Anderson was made one of the vice-presidents of the Old Peterite Club at St Peter's School, York.

Death and legacy
He was one of the five original Trustees of the Percy Sladen Memorial Trust. He was President of the Yorkshire Philosophical Society, and in 1912 he presented the society with a 300-seat lecture theatre (the Tempest Anderson Hall'') attached to the Yorkshire Museum in York Museum Gardens. This was one of the world's first concrete buildings. He died on board ship on the Red Sea while returning from visiting the volcanoes of Indonesia and the Philippines.  He was buried in Suez, Egypt. After his death, the houses he had built were left to his cousin, Colonel Fearnley Anderson.. He also bequeathed a substantial sum to the Yorkshire Museum. He held Telephone Number "1" in the first York Telephone Driectory in 1891, published by the "National Telephone Company".

Expeditions

Mexico, Guatemala and the West Indies
Tempest Anderson spent nine months in Mexico, Guatemala and the West Indies in 1906/1907. He travelled to Mexico to attend the 10th Congres Geologique International before sailing by mail steamer to Guatemala to study the effects of the 1902 earthquake. During the trip he observed and photographed Cerro Quemado, Santa Maria, and Atitlan.
During this trip he collected first hand accounts of the 1902 eruption of the Santa Maria and the immediate aftermath. Captain Saunders of the Pacific Mail Steamer S.S. Newport observed the eruption cloud which rose to a great height. The Captain measured it using a sextant and recorded it as reaching 17 to 18 miles. The sounds accompanying the eruption were loud and were heard even louder at more distant places than close to the mountain. The eruption was heard as far away as Guatemala City, the noises so strong, they were assumed to come from neighbouring volcanoes.

Publications
Articles
  
 
 
 
 
 
 
 
 
 
 
 
 
 
 
 
 
 
 

Books

Notes

Further reading
 
 
 

1846 births
1913 deaths
British volcanologists
English surgeons
British ophthalmologists
People from York
Photographers from Yorkshire
19th-century English medical doctors
Yorkshire Museum people
Members of the Yorkshire Philosophical Society
Medical doctors from Yorkshire
People educated at St Peter's School, York